Igor Vladimirovich Makarov (born 6 February 1961) is a former Russian professional footballer.

Club career
He made his professional debut in the Soviet Second League in 1980 for FShM Moscow.

References

1961 births
Footballers from Moscow
Living people
Soviet footballers
Russian footballers
Soviet First League players
Russian Premier League players
FC Asmaral Moscow players
FC Lokomotiv Moscow players
FC Zhemchuzhina Sochi players
FC Shinnik Yaroslavl players
Association football defenders
FC Torpedo Moscow players
Russian expatriate footballers
Expatriate footballers in Morocco
FC FShM Torpedo Moscow players